Thyssen is a Low Frankish and Dutch patronymic surname. It is derived from the common given name Thijs, a short form of Mathijs (Matthew). The Dutch digraph ij and the y ("ij" without dots) were used interchangeably until the surname spelling fixations around 1810. While Thijssen is the more common form in the Netherlands, "Thyssen" prevails elsewhere. It may refer to:

People 
 Craig Thyssen (born 1984), South African cricketer
 Greta Thyssen (1933–2018), Danish film actress and model
 Ingrid Thyssen (born 1956), German javelin thrower
 Marianne Thyssen (born 1956), Belgian politician and EU Commissioner
 Nicole Thyssen (born 1988), Dutch tennis player
 Ole Thyssen (born 1944), Danish philosopher and sociologist
 Thyssen family, an industrialist family originating in Aachen, with many notable members including:
Friedrich Thyssen  (1804–1877), German banker
August Thyssen  (1842–1926), German founder of the Thyssen steel company, son of Friedrich
Joseph Thyssen (1844–1915), German industrialist, son of Friedrich
Fritz Thyssen (1873–1951), head of the Thyssen mining and steelmaking company, son of August
Heinrich Thyssen later Heinrich Freiherr Thyssen-Bornemisza (1875–1947), German-Hungarian entrepreneur and art collector, son of August
, baroness Batthyány (1911–1989), daughter of Heinrich, associated with the 
Baron Hans Heinrich Thyssen-Bornemisza (1921–2002), founder of the Thyssen-Bornemisza Museum, son of Heinrich
Francesca Thyssen-Bornemisza (born 1958), Swiss art collector and by marriage Francesca von Habsburg, daughter of Hans Heinrich
Tita Thyssen née Carmen Cervera (born 1943), Spanish model and art collector, fifth wife of Hans Heinrich
Bodo Thyssen (1918–2004), German industrialist and medical doctor, grandson of Joseph
 Thysse
Andre Thysse (1968–2021), South African heavyweight boxer
 Thyssens
Germaine Thyssens-Valentin (1902–1987), Dutch-born French pianist

Other 
Thyssen AG, steel company founded by August Thyssen, with successors and subsidiaries including:
ThyssenKrupp, one of the world's largest steel producers, formed by merger of the Thyssen and Krupp steel companies

See also
Thissen
Thiessen (disambiguation)
Thijssen
Thys

Patronymic surnames
Surnames from given names